ʿĀʾisha bint Ṭalḥa was, according to a Sunni source, the daughter of the prominent Muslim general Talha ibn Ubayd Allah and Umm Kulthum bint Abi Bakr. Umm Kulthum was the daughter of the first Rashidun Caliph, Abu Bakr.

Her first husband was her cousin Abd Allah, son of Abd al-Rahman ibn Abi Bakr. She then married Mus'ab ibn al-Zubayr, governor of Basra, who was killed. Her third husband was Umar ibn Ubayd Allah al-Taymi.

The following words are attributed to her about veil, widely recognized dress code for women in Islam.

"Since the Almighty hath put on me the stamp of beauty, it is my wish that the public should view the beauty and thereby recognized His grace unto them. On no account, therefore, will I veil myself."

See also
Aisha (given name)
Talhah (name)

References

Tabi‘un
Banu Taym
7th-century Arabs
7th-century women
Tabi‘un hadith narrators